Lawyacado is a town in the Awdal region of Somaliland. It is situated on the border with Djibouti.

Demographics
As of 2012, the population of Lawyacado has been estimated to be 37,600. The town inhabitants belong to various mainly Afro-Asiatic-speaking ethnic groups, with the Gadabuursi and Issa subclans of the Dir especially well represented.

See also

References

External links

Populated places in Awdal